Philipp François Köhn (born 2 April 1998) is a professional footballer who plays as a goalkeeper for Austrian Bundesliga club Red Bull Salzburg. Born in Germany, he plays for the Switzerland U21 national team.

Personal life
He was born in Dinslaken, North Rhine-Westphalia, Germany to a German father and a Swiss mother from Lausanne.

Club career

RB Leipzig
On 23 February 2017, the then Leipzig sporting director, Ralf Rangnick announced that Köhn would sign with the club as soon as his Stuttgart contract expires in the summer. On 4 June 2017, Köhn signed a four year deal keeping him at the German club till June 2021. He didn't make any appearances for the club.

Red Bull Salzburg
On 6 July 2018, Red Bull Salzburg announced that they had signed Köhn from Leipzig, their unofficial sister club, on a four-year contract. Since Liefering is Salzburg's feeder team, he is eligible to play for both clubs as a cooperation player. During the 2019/2020 pre-season friendly, Köhn played in a football match between Salzburg and Chelsea in the Red Bull Arena, replacing Cican Stankovic at half time. He conceded two goals from Pedro and Batshuayi as the match ended in a 5–3 loss. He is yet to make his first team debut for Red Bull Salzburg, but has featured for Liefering twelve times.

Wil 
On 29 July 2020 he went to Swiss side Wil on loan.
After 33 matches he went back to Salzburg.

International career
Köhn has represented Germany from under-15 to under-18 age group, before switching his allegiance to Switzerland. He has been playing for Switzerland from under-19. He currently plays for the Switzerland under-21, and was named to Switzerland's 2022 World Cup squad.

Honours
Austrian Bundesliga: 2019-20, 2021-22
Austrian Cup: 2019–20,  2021-22

References

External links 

1998 births 
Living people
Swiss men's footballers
Switzerland youth international footballers
Switzerland under-21 international footballers
German footballers
Germany youth international footballers
Swiss people of German descent
German people of Swiss descent
Association football goalkeepers
FC Liefering players
FC Wil players
FC Red Bull Salzburg players
2. Liga (Austria) players
Swiss Challenge League players
Austrian Football Bundesliga players
2022 FIFA World Cup players
People from Wesel (district)
Sportspeople from Düsseldorf (region)
Footballers from North Rhine-Westphalia